A Hostage and the Meaning of Life is an album by the rock band Brazil.

Reception

Track listing
 "A Hostage" – 2:56
 "The Novemberist" – 4:47
 "Io" – 3:34
 "Escape" – 3:14
 "We" – 3:03
 "The Iconoclast" – 5:19
 "Zentropa" – 3:04
 "Fall Into" – 4:15
 "Metropol" – 6:41
 "Aventine" – 3:45
 "Form and Function" – 2:12
 "Fatale and Futique" – 5:14

Credits
Jonathon Newby – Vocals, MOOG, vocoder
Nic Newby – keyboards
Aaron Smith – electric guitar
Eric Johnson – electric guitar
James Sefchek – drums
Benjamin Hunt – bass

With

Alex Newport – producer, engineer, mastering
Matt Miller and J.R. Cary– pre-production
Album Photography – Lisa K. Fett
Sleeve Art – Colin May

External links

Official sites
Brazil's Web Site
Brazil's Myspace
Brazil's Purevolume

Brazil (band) albums
2004 albums
Albums produced by Alex Newport